Adelshofen may refer to the following places in Germany:

Adelshofen, Middle Franconia, in the district of Ansbach, Bavaria
Adelshofen, Upper Bavaria, in the district of Fürstenfeldbruck, Bavaria
 , a district of Eppingen, Baden-Württemberg